The Brunei Super League (Liga Super Brunei in Malay) is a Bruneian professional league for association football. It is at the top flight of the Bruneian football league system and it is managed by the Football Association of Brunei Darussalam (FABD). The clubs participating in this top flight league need to pass a set of requirements and verification process, particularly related to professionalism and infrastructure feasibility.

The championship winner will receive B$15,000 ($11,400 USD) as prize money, as well as a qualifying berth to the AFC Cup as Brunei's representative, provided that the club conforms to AFC's Club Licence criteria. The runners-up will get B$10,000 ($7,000 USD).

History

There has been a football competition in Brunei since 1985 which was organised by the Brunei Football Association (BAFA). BAFA introduced a league competition known then as the Proton B-League in 2002.

In 2008, the Brunei government de-registered BAFA from its Register of Societies, and acknowledged a new football federation, the Football Federation of Brunei Darussalam (FFBD). This irked international football's governing body FIFA to suspend Brunei's membership in September 2009 due to government interference. FIFA reinstated Brunei in May 2011, recognizing another football association, the National Football Association of Brunei Darussalam (NFABD) as its representative to Brunei. This resulted in the abandonment of the 2011 Brunei Premier League which was organized by FFBD.

The NFABD reorganized the Brunei football league system, establishing a "super" league as the competition's top tier (thus mirroring the current league naming system of the Malaysians) which will be played after a preliminary competition which will decide the teams that will be in the new league. This became the 2011–12 Brunei National Football League, where 32 teams in 4 groups qualify for 10 places in the Brunei Super League.

The founding members of the Brunei Super League are: Indera FC, Jerudong FC, Kilanas FC, LLRC FT, Majra United FC, MS ABDB, MS PDB, Najip FC, QAF FC and Wijaya FC.

Current format

In the 2020 season, the league was expanded to sixteen teams in accordance to FIFA, AFC and AFF's aspirations. 

Players aged 35 years and over must produce a medical fitness certification to be registered for the league. Each matchday squad must contain a minimum of four under-21 players with at least two of them in the starting lineup.

At the end of the season the champion is crowned. Tiebreaker in the standings are in descending order: Points, goal difference, goals scored, head-to-head record between tied teams, goal difference between tied teams, goals scored between tied teams, and drawing of lots.

Teams

A total of 16 clubs are competing in the 2023 season. AKSE Bersatu and Lun Bawang are the two promoted sides from the district leagues.

 AKSE Bersatu
 BAKES FC
 BSRC FC
 IKLS-MB5
 Indera SC
 Jerudong FC
 Kasuka FC
 KB FC
 Kota Ranger FC
 Lun Bawang FC
 MS ABDB
 MS PPDB
 Panchor Murai FC
 Rimba Star FC
 Setia Perdana FC
 Wijaya FC

Championship

Records

Top scorers

Best player award

All-time goalscoring record

Players in bold are still playing in the Super League.
Players in italics are no longer active.

References

External links
 National Football Association of Brunei Darussalam 
 Brunei Darussalam's Page in ASEAN Football
 Brunei Darussalam's Page in FIFA.com
 RSSSF.com - Brunei - List of Champions

 
1
Brunei